Paragyrodon is a genus of fungi in the family Paxillaceae. It is a monotypic genus, containing the single species Paragyrodon sphaerosporus. Paragyrodon was circumscribed by Rolf Singer in 1942.

Distribution and habitat 
The species is distributed mostly around the Great Lakes Region, however, the species has also been observed further west in Kansas, Iowa and Colorado.  The species has been associated with the white oak and the gambel oak in Colorado.

See also
 List of North American boletes

References

Paxillaceae
Monotypic Boletales genera
Taxa named by Rolf Singer